Bashab (also Romanized as Bashāb) is a village in Mulan Rural District, in the Central District of Kaleybar County, East Azerbaijan Province, Iran. At the 2006 census, its population was 455, in 112 families.

References 

Populated places in Kaleybar County